Orphan-Maker (Peter) is a fictional mutant character appearing in American comic books published by Marvel Comics. His first appearance was in X-Factor vol. 1 #31.

Publication history
Orphan-Maker's first appearance was in X-Factor #31 (August 1988), and he was created by Louise Simonson and Walt Simonson.

The character subsequently appears in X-Factor #35 (December 1988), #40 (May 1989), The Uncanny X-Men #247-248 (August–September 1989), #265-267 (August–September 1990), Generation X #2-4 (December 1994-February 1995), Generation X Holiday Special #1 (February 1998), Slingers #9 (August 1999), and Wolverine: Killing Made Simple #1 (October 2008).

Orphan-Maker received an entry in the Official Handbook of the Marvel Universe Update '89 #5.

Fictional character biography

First encounters
When Peter was still a very small child, he was held captive in Mister Sinister's "orphanage", because he had the potential to be a very dangerous weapon once his X-Gene was activated. Sinister planned on turning him into a living bomb, but upon realising how immense his destructive powers were and the danger he posed, including to himself, Sinister decided he was too powerful and must be killed. Saved by the cyborg Nanny, he became the first of her "Lost Boys (and Girls)". Nanny fitted him with a suit of armor that would suppress his uncontrollable powers and give him the appearance of a large Man. Under Nanny's direction, Peter, as the Orphan-Maker, began to kill the parents of young mutants (and thus "orphaning" them) and abducting them for Nanny.

They would confront the X-Men operating out of a small, faux-town in the Australian outback. Dazzler and Havok are ambushed and stunned in a ship designed to look like a crash-landed artifact. The captured are physically converted into children. They are given battlesuits themselves and convinced to attack the other X-Men. Some assistance is given by Jubilee, whom the X-Men did not know of at the time. 

Orphan-Maker and Nanny are temporarily defeated after Colossus rescues Havok from his battlesuit. Confused and disoriented from his experience, Havok blasts Nanny's ship, causing much destruction and seemingly causing the death of Storm. However, Orphan-Maker and Nanny had left behind a dead body that looked like Storm, while de-aging and kidnapping her.

Later appearances
The pair would later confront X-Factor, a super-team made up of the five original X-Men.

During an incident where a mentally ill young mutant had taken hostages inside his school, Orphan-Maker was driven away partly because the mutant Skin managed to interfere with his suit's energy flow. He managed to escape pursuit in a technologically advanced vehicle disguised as an ice cream truck.

Later on, he and Nanny battled with Wolverine after they tried to make an orphan out of Trance (a former X-student).

Dawn of X
In the new status quo for mutants post House of X and Powers of X, Professor X and Magneto invite all mutants to live on Krakoa and welcome even former enemies into their fold. Orphan Maker joins a loose group of outcast mutants, operating under Mister Sinister: the Hellions, which also comprise Havok, Kwannon, Empath, John Greycrow, Nanny and Wild Child. Their first mission was to destroy Sinister's old outdated cloning lab "The State Home for Foundlings". However, when they got there they found it had been taken over by Madelyne Pryor who sent perverse, zombie-like Marauders to attack them. They were rescued by their teammates, who completed the mission. On this mission Nanny developed a deep hatred of Mister Sinister after seeing the remains of the many mutant children he had experimented on, she confronted him after the mission, telling him he would get his due for what he's done.

Their second mission was to the Hell-like dimension of Amenth through Otherworld. Sinister had arranged this mission in order to steal the weapons of the Swordbearers of Arakko forcing them to forfeit Saturnyne's X of Swords challenge. When they got there Sinister betrayed them by revealing they were actually the to collect DNA samples from the mutants of Arakko and Nanny, Orphan-Maker and Wild Child were killed by the godlike Arakki mutant, Tarn the Uncaring and his servants, the Locus Vile.

They were resurrected by the Five and as a result of dying in Amenth, they all came back different and stronger. Realizing how potentially dangerous Orphan-Maker would be if he came back the same way, the rest of the team had to team had to reclaim Nanny's ship from The Right so she could build a new suit of armor to contain his powers.

On his return, Orphan-Maker became more physically mature, though still mentally and emotionally stunted, he developed a rebellious streak and began trying to be more independent from Nanny. This did not last long however, and he soon went back to craving Nanny's attention. However, due to his earlier behavior, she neglected him and began caring for an orphaned A.I. baby that she'd taken, unbeknownst to the rest of the team, from their fight with the Right after the rest of their A.I.'s were destroyed by a Krakoan virus. Orphan-Maker eventually discovered the baby in Nanny's room, when she found him holding it, she became furious and kicked him out, threatening him if he ever told anyone, causing him to break down in tears.

After the Hellions' final mission, a re-match with Tarn and the Locus Vile, which ended with the destruction of Sinister's secret clone farm (and the death of the Sinister/Tarn chimera he had been working on), Nanny's ship was hijacked by the Right and her husband Dr. Harold Murch. She escaped but her robot "child" was stolen. When Peter tried to help her, she yelled at him for not being there when she needed him.

Desperate to prove himself to Nanny, Orphan-Maker stormed the Right's base to retrieve his "baby brother". The rest of the Hellions (minus Nanny, Sinister and Empath) reformed to pursue him and give him aid. He managed to single-handedly fight his way into the heart of the compound and find the robot, only for Nanny to immediately storm in after and take it from him. In spite of his heroism she continued to ignore him and pay attention to the robot, only for its mutant-hating A.I. to kick-in, causing it to kill her. Distraught over her death, Peter went on a rampage and killed everyone he came across, including two park rangers who had overheard the commotion and came to investigate. He was found by the Hellions exhausted and begging forgiveness.

Peter was put on trial by the Quiet Council of Krakoa for killing two innocent humans, with the Hellions as character references. In spite of their pleas and Nightcrawler's defense, a terrified Orphan-Maker was sentenced to exile within Krakoa. Just as he was about to be swallowed into the depths of the island, A returned Nanny intervened, demanding to be exiled with him. After threatening the Council members and their families, the two were both found guilty. They were swallowed up by the island together as Nanny sang him a nursery rhyme. After spending some time in The Pit they were eventually freed by Cypher along with the other exiles: Third-Eye, Nekra, Oya, Madison Jeffries, Melter and Toad. They were then sent from Krakoa with the mission to hunt down Sabretooth.

Tracking him to the Orchis created Noble Island, Nanny became jealous of the friendships he was developing with the rest of the team and guilted him into staying on the boat. However they were attacked by a super-powered Orchis member named “The Creation” who kidnapped Orphan-Maker for experimentation because of how destructive his powers were. Nanny assured the rest of the team that if they separated Orphan-Maker from his armour no one on earth would survive. Peter was taken to Orchis's second base for Mutant experimentation in the middle of an area of the Pacific Ocean called the Ring of Fire. There he met Doctor Barrington who after finding out only he could remove his suit, took advantage of his nievete and manipulated him into removing his mask. Without his mask his X-Gene finally activated and his face glowed with energy, Dr. Barrington the person closest to him was seemingly killed and her creation fled in terror. He was later reunited with Nanny and the rest of the Exiles who had come to rescue him, he apologised to Nanny for breaking his promise to her never to remove her armour and tried to put his helmet back on, but the damage was done and his powers were about to destroy the whole base. Sabretooth suggested throwing him in a volcano to rest of the groups anger. Third-Eye then put into motion another plan that involved taking them back to the Astral Plane. When Peter first woke up in the Astral Plane he panicked because he thought he was in Hell for killing Doctor Barrington. While Melter kept him calm, Nanny and Jeffries built him a new suit.

Powers and abilities
Orphan-Maker is a mutant, he possesses an unknown but potentially world-ending power. Everyone aware of how it works is afraid of what will happen if his X-Gene becomes active, including Charles Xavier, Nanny and Mister Sinister. He wears a battle suit that gives him certain abilities but also suppresses his natural ones. If any part of his body spends too much time outside the armor, the armor will no longer be able to contain it.

His armor being breached in a fight with the Marauders, caused him to begin spewing an acid-like substance that melted  Scrambler's face. When he took his helmet off on his own volition, his head glowed with ethereal white energy, and the person closest to him was apparently killed instantly. Super powered beings seem to be able to stand close to him in this state slightly longer.

After dying in Amenth, his physique, personality and powers were all enhanced to an unknown degree. Although this effect may have only been temporary. Also, he remains intellectually a child.

Battle Suit
Orphan-Maker's armor is highly resistant to most forms of attack, and has certain reflective properties that allow him to deflect energy attacks such as Cyclops' optic blasts. The suit also enhances his strength, and may suppress his mutant powers. Orphan-Maker is equipped with large guns that fire destructive energies. When he was outfitted with his new armor, the suit had the capability of forming guns out of its hands.

Footnotes

External links

Characters created by Louise Simonson
Characters created by Walt Simonson
Comics characters introduced in 1988
Marvel Comics characters with superhuman strength
Marvel Comics male supervillains
Marvel Comics supervillains
Marvel Comics mutants
Marvel Comics orphans